Montargis is a railway station in Montargis, Centre-Val de Loire, France. The station is located on the Moret-Lyon railway. The station is served by Intercités (long distance) services operated by SNCF between Paris and Nevers, and by Transilien line R (from Paris-Gare de Lyon).

References

External links 

 

Railway stations in Loiret
Railway stations in France opened in 1860